Lelio Orci (22 March 1937 – 22 October 2019)  was an Italian scientist in the field of endocrinology and diabetes and emeritus professor in the Department of Morphology at the University of Geneva Medical School.

Orci was born in 1937 in San Giovanni Incarico. He received his BA in 1958. He studied medicine at the University of Rome, graduating in 1964. In 1966, he moved to the University of Geneva where he worked ever since. He was chair of the Department of Morphology from 1976 to 2002, and retired in 2004.

Orci is known for his work in electron microscopy. In 1984, he began collaborating with James Rothman on the work in vesicle trafficking that eventually earned Rothman, Randy Schekman, and Thomas C. Südhof the Nobel Prize.

Awards 
 1973 : Minkowski Prize (European Association for the Study of Diabetes)
 1977 : Nessim Habif Prize 
 1979 : Fernand Tissot Prize
 1978 : Mack-Foster Award (European Society for Clinical Investigation)
 1978 : David Rumbough Award (American Juvenile Diabetes Foundation)
 1981 : Banting Medal (American Diabetes Association)
 1983 : Dale Medal (Society for Endocrinology)
 1985 : King Faisal International Prize for Medicine
 1986 : Otto Naegeli Prize for Medicine
 1986 : Special Golgi Award (European Association for the Study of Diabetes)
 1987 : Morgagni Medal (G.B. Morgagni International Prizes)
 1991 : Elliot P. Joslin Award (Massachusetts Affiliate of the American Diabetes Association)
 1998 : Member of the Senate of the Swiss Academy of Medical Sciences
 1998 : Foreign Member of National Academy of Sciences
 1999 : Fellow of the American Association for the Advancement of Science
 2000 : Lucien Dautrebande Triennial Prize (The Physiopathology Foundation)
 2007 : Leon Lombarti Prize
 Order of Commander of Honor by the Italian Government

The Lelio Orci Award for advances in cell biology was established in 2015.

References 

1937 births
2019 deaths
Italian endocrinologists
Fellows of the American Association for the Advancement of Science
Foreign associates of the National Academy of Sciences
Academic staff of the University of Geneva
People from the Province of Frosinone
Minkowski Prize recipients
Italian diabetologists